Vengarai Periyakottaikadu is a village in the Orathanadu taluk of Thanjavur district, Tamil Nadu, India.

Demographics 

As per the 2001 census, Vengarai Periyakottaikadu had a total population of 1325 with 631 males and 692 females. The sex ratio was 1100. The literacy rate was 67.01.

References 

 

Villages in Thanjavur district